Epichoristodes niphosema is a species of moth of the family Tortricidae. It is found in Western Cape, South Africa.

References

Endemic moths of South Africa
Moths described in 1917
Archipini